The Well is a 1913 American drama film featuring Harry Carey.

Cast
 Lionel Barrymore - The Farmer
 Claire McDowell - The Farmer's Wife
 Harry Carey - Giuseppe, the Farmhand
 George Beranger - The Accomplice

Plot
The movie was released with the logline: "Success Is often coveted instead of honestly earned. Through honest effort the farmer was enjoying the fruits of his labor,  A. large irrigation well was among his new acquisitions. Therein his designing helpers held him prisoner while they left with his wealth and his daughter. There is an old saying, however, that an evil purpose always defeats its own end by some committing act."

See also
 Harry Carey filmography
 Lionel Barrymore filmography

References

External links

1913 films
American silent short films
American black-and-white films
1913 drama films
1913 short films
Films directed by Anthony O'Sullivan
Silent American drama films
1910s American films